This list of Arctic expeditions is a timeline of historic Arctic exploration and explorers of the Arctic.

15th century 

 1472: Didrik Pining and Hans Pothorst mark the first of the cartographic expeditions to Greenland
 1496: , venturing out of the White Sea, travels along the Murman Coast and the coast of northern Norway

16th century 

 1553: English expedition led by Hugh Willoughby with Richard Chancellor as second in command searches for the Northeast Passage
 1557: English expedition led by Stephen Borough reaches the Kara Strait
 1576–1578: English expeditions led by Martin Frobisher reach Baffin Island
 1579: Danish-Norwegian expedition led by James Alday fails to reach Greenland due to ice
 1580: English expedition led by Arthur Pet and Charles Jackman reaches the Kara Sea
 1581: Danish-Norwegian expedition led by Magnus Heinason fails to reach Greenland due to ice
 1585–1587: English expeditions led by John Davis explore the Davis Strait–Baffin Bay region and reach Upernavik
 1594: Dutch expedition led by Willem Barentsz, Cornelis Nay and Brandt Tetgales reaches the Kara Sea via Yugorsky Strait
 1595: Dutch expedition led by Cornelis Nay fails to make further progress towards a Northeast Passage than in the previous year
 1596–1597: Dutch expedition piloted by Willem Barentsz discovers Spitsbergen and registered the first recorded Farthest North

17th century 

 1605–1607: Danish-Norwegian king, Christian IV of Denmark, sends three expeditions led by John Cunningham, Godske Lindenov and Carsten Richardson (all piloted by James Hall), to search for the lost Eastern Settlement, one of the Norse colonies on Greenland
 1607: Henry Hudson explores Spitsbergen
 1608: Henry Hudson gets as far as Novaya Zemlya in his attempt to find the Northeast Passage
 1609: another unsuccessful attempt by Henry Hudson at finding the Northeast Passage
 1610: Jonas Poole thoroughly explores Spitsbergen's west coast, reporting that he saw a "great store of whales"; this report leads to the establishment of the English whaling trade
 1610: Russian Kondratiy Kurochkin explores the mouth of the Yenisei River and the adjoining coast
 1610–1611: Henry Hudson reaches Hudson Bay in an attempt to find the Northwest Passage
 1612: James Hall and William Baffin explore southwest Greenland
 1612–1613: Button expedition, commanded by Thomas Button, in search of the Northwest Passage
 1613: Several whaling expeditions, consisting of a total of at least thirty ships from England, France, Spain, and the Netherlands crowd Spitsbergen's west coast
 1614: Dutch and French expeditions discover Jan Mayen
 1615: Robert Fotherby, in the pinnace Richard, is the first English expedition to reach Jan Mayen
 1615: English expedition captained by Robert Bylot and piloted by William Baffin reaches the Foxe Basin in search of the Northwest Passage
 1616: English expedition captained by Robert Bylot and piloted by William Baffin explores the Davis Strait–Baffin Bay region
 1619–1620: Danish-Norwegian expedition led by Jens Munk in Enhiörningen (Unicorn) and Lamprenen (Lamprey) to discover the Northwest Passage penetrated Davis Strait as far north as 69°, found Frobisher Bay, spent a winter in Hudson Bay
 1633–1634: I. Rebrov explores the mouth of the Lena River
 1633–1635: Ilya Perfilyev explores the Lena and Yana Rivers and intervening coast
 1638: I. Rebrov explores coast between the Lena and Indigirka Rivers
 1641: Dimitry Zyryan and Mikhail Stadukhin explore the mouth of the Indigirka River and adjoining coast
 1646: I. Ignatyev explores the mouth of the Kolyma River and adjoining coast
 1648: Ya. Semyonov explores the mouth of Kotuy River and adjoining coast
 1648: Semyon Dezhnev and Fedot Alekseyevich Popov explore from the Kolyma River through the Bering Strait
 1649: Mikhail Stadukhin explores the coast from the Kolyma River to the Bering Strait
 1676: English expedition led by John Wood fails to find the Northeast Passage
 1686–1687: Ivan Tolstoukhov expedition explores the mouth of the Yenisey River and the coast of the Taymyr Peninsula

18th century 

 1712: Merkury Vagin and Yakov Permyakov explore the vicinity of the mouth of the Yana River and adjoining coasts, both were murdered by mutineering expedition members
 1725–1730: Vitus Bering leads the First Kamchatka expedition
 1728: Claus Paarss attempts to cross Greenland's interior from the west in search of the old Norse Eastern Settlement
 1733–1743: Second Kamchatka expedition explores the north coast of Russia and discovers Alaska
 1751: Lars Dalager attempts to find the lost Eastern Settlement by crossing Greenland's ice sheet from the west
 1751–1753: Peder Olsen Walløe explores the east coast of Greenland from Cape Farewell in umiaks
 1760–1763: S.F. Loshkin explores Novaya Zemlya
 1765–1766: Vasily Chichagov explores the Kola Peninsula coast and Spitzbergen
 1768–1769: F.F. Rozmyslov explores Novaya Zemlya and the Matochkin Strait
 1770–1771: Samuel Hearne traces the Coppermine River to the Arctic Ocean
 1773: Ivan Lyakhov discovered Kotelny Island
 1776–1780: James Cook charts the northwestern coast of America and sails through the Bering Strait during his third voyage in search of the Northwest Passage
 1785–1794: Russian expedition led by Joseph Billings explores Eastern Siberia, the Aleutian Islands, and the west coast of Alaska
 1789: Alexander Mackenzie traces the Mackenzie River to the Arctic Ocean

19th century

Early Period (1800–1818) 
 1800: Yakov Sannikov charts Stolbovoy Island
 1809–1811: Yakov Sannikov and Matvei Gedenschtrom explore the New Siberian Islands
 1815–1818: Otto von Kotzebue explores the Bering Strait during the

Ross, Parry and Franklin (1818–1846) 
 1818: Royal Navy expedition led by captain David Buchan sails north from Spitsbergen
 1818: Royal Navy expedition led by John Ross with his nephew James Clark Ross, sails north along the west coast of Greenland to Pituffik in search of the Northwest Passage and encounters the Inughuit (Greenlandic Inuit) of Cape York
 1819: Royal Navy expedition aboard  and  led by William Edward Parry in search of the Northwest Passage
 1819–1822: The Coppermine expedition in northern Canada, led by John Franklin, includes George Back and John Richardson

1820s 
 1820–1824: Ferdinand von Wrangel and Fyodor Matyushkin explore the East Siberian Sea and the Chukchi Sea areas
 1821–1824: Fyodor Litke explores the eastern Barents Sea and the west coast of Novaya Zemlya, including Matochkin Strait
 1821–1823: Pyotr Anjou continues exploration of New Siberian Islands
 1822: William Scoresby lands in east Greenland near the mouth of the fjord system that would later be named for him – Scoresby Sound
 1823: Douglas Clavering and Edward Sabine explore East Greenland northwards to Clavering Island, where they get in contact with the now extinct Inuit of Northeast Greenland
 1825–1827: The Mackenzie River expedition descends the Mackenzie River and maps much of the Arctic coast
 1826: Frederick William Beechey aboard  explores the Alaskan coast from Point Barrow to the Bering Strait
 1827: First Norwegian expedition to the Arctic, led by Baltazar Mathias Keilhau
 1827: Royal Navy expedition to Spitsbergen led by William Edward Parry reaches 82°45’N
 1828–1830: Danish expedition led by Wilhelm August Graah tries to locate the Eastern Settlement in southeast Greenland, but does not reach Ammassalik Island.
 1829–1833: Royal Navy expedition led by John Ross to search for the Northwest Passage explores James Ross Strait and King William Land, locates the North Magnetic Pole

1830s and 1840s 
 1832–1835: Pyotr Pakhtusov explores the southern half of the eastern coast of Novaya Zemlya
 1833–1835: Royal Navy expedition led by George Back from Fort Reliance to the mouth of the Back River at Chantrey Inlet
 1836: George Back attempts to ascertain if Boothia Peninsula is an island or a peninsula but his ship, is trapped by ice near Southampton Island
 1837: Karl Ernst von Baer leads a natural history expedition to Novaya Zemlya
 1838–1839: Avgust Tsivolko leads an expedition to Novaya Zemlya, primarily for surveying
 1838–1840: La Recherche expedition, under the command of Joseph Paul Gaimard, a scientific venture to explore the islands in the North Atlantic
 1845: Franklin's Northwest Passage expedition is sent to map the remaining Northwest Passage

Search for Franklin (1846–1857) 
 1848: John Richardson and John Rae lead the Rae–Richardson Arctic expedition and search overland for Franklin's lost expedition
 1849: Henry Kellett discovers Herald Island searching for Franklin's lost expedition
 1850–1854: McClure Arctic expedition led by Robert McClure, a British search for the members of Franklin's lost expedition
 1850–1851: First Grinnell expedition led by Edwin De Haven, the first American search for the members of Franklin's lost expedition, finds the graves of crew members John Torrington, William Braine and John Hartnell on Beechey Island
 1851: William Kennedy leads a search expedition for Franklin in the Prince Albert, sponsored by Lady Franklin
 1853–1855: Second Grinnell expedition led by Elisha Kane looks for Franklin searching Grinnell Land
 1857–1859: McClintock Arctic expedition led by Francis Leopold McClintock is the fifth expedition sponsored by Lady Franklin and finds artefacts, a crew members skeleton and the final written communications from the last survivors of the Franklin expedition

Nordenskiöld Period (1857–1879) 
 1858: Swedish expedition to Spitsbergen led by Otto Martin Torell

1860s 
1860: Paul A. Chadbourne, a Williams College professor, conducts the Williams College Lyceum of Natural History expedition to Greenland.
 1860–1861: American Arctic Expedition led by Isaac Israel Hayes who claims to see the Open Polar Sea
 1860–1862: First expedition led by American Charles Francis Hall searching for Franklin
 1861: Swedish expedition to Svalbard led by Otto Martin Torell explores Hinlopen Strait and the north coast of Nordaustlandet
 1861–1862: Otto Paul von Krusenstern's expedition through the Kara Sea on the Yermak
 1864: Swedish expedition to Svalbard led by Adolf Erik Nordenskiöld
 1864–1869: Charles Francis Hall leads his second expedition to determine the fate of Franklin, to King William Island
 1867: Edward Whymper and Robert Brown attempt to explore the inland ice of Greenland
 1868: First German North Polar Expedition led by Carl Koldewey along the east coast of Greenland
 1868: Swedish expedition led by Adolf Erik Nordenskiöld attempts farthest north from Svalbard
 1869–1870: Second German North Polar Expedition ( and Hansa) led by Carl Koldewey reaches Sabine Island

1870s 
 1870 Adolf Erik Nordenskiöld leads a short journey on the inland ice of Western Greenland
 1871: Benjamin Leigh Smith's first expedition explores the northeastern boundary of Svalbard
 1871–1873: Polaris expedition, known for the death of its commander, Charles Francis Hall
 1872: Benjamin Leigh Smith returns to Svalbard in his second expedition
 1872–1873: Swedish expedition to Svalbard led by Adolf Erik Nordenskiöld winters at Mosselbukta
 1872–1874: Austro-Hungarian North Pole expedition led by Captain Karl Weyprecht discovers Franz Josef Land
 1873: Benjamin Leigh Smith comes to Nordenskiöld's aid in Spitsbergen
 1875: Adolf Erik Nordenskiöld is the first to reach the Yenisey by sea
 1875–1876: British Arctic Expedition led by Captain George Nares
 1876: Adolf Erik Nordenskiöld repeats his voyage to the Yenisey
 1876–1878: Norwegian Northern Seas expedition in Vøringen explored the Northern Atlantic up to 80°N
 1877–1878: Henry W. Howgate leads the Howgate Preliminary Polar Expedition to promote scientific experiments, and whaling as a source of revenue
 1878: J. A. D. Jensen explores the inland ice sheet from west Greenland
 1878–1881: different voyages with Dutch polar schooner Willem Barents in the area around Spitsbergen and Novaya Zemlya, organised by the Royal Dutch Geographical Society
 1878–1879: Swedish Vega expedition led by Adolf Erik Nordenskiöld completes the Northeast Passage

Race for the Pole (1879–1900) 
 1879–1882: Jeannette expedition commanded by George W. De Long attempts to reach the North Pole by sea from the Bering Strait
 1880: Henry W. Howgate leads the Howgate Arctic expedition for scientific and geographical exploration of Greenland
 1880: Benjamin Leigh Smith's fourth expedition explores the southwestern area of Franz Josef Land
 1881–1882: Benjamin Leigh Smith's final expedition is shipwrecked in Franz Josef Land
 1881–1884: Lady Franklin Bay Expedition, US Army Signal Corps expedition led by Adolphus Greely

International Polar Year 
 1882–1883: The Danish Dijmphna expedition travels to the territory between Russia and the North Pole
 1883–1885: Umiak expedition, led by Gustav Frederik Holm and Thomas Vilhelm Garde along the southeastern coast of Greenland in the shallow waters between the coast and the sea ice
 1883: Failed attempt by Adolf Erik Nordenskiöld to cross Greenland from the west
 1886: Failed attempt by Robert Peary to cross Greenland
 1888–1889: First successful crossing of the Greenland inland ice by the Norwegian expedition led by Fridtjof Nansen (from east to west)

1890s 
 1891–1892: The East Greenland expedition on the Hekla led by Carl Ryder fails to get through the sea ice of east Greenland, but explores the Scoresby Sound system in detail
 1891–1892: Second Peary expedition to Greenland led by Peary to discover if Greenland is an island or a peninsula
 1892: Björling–Kallstenius Expedition led by Alfred Björling was eventually wrecked on the Carey Islands
 1893–1895: Third US Greenland expedition led by Peary
 1894 Failed attempt by Walter Wellman to reach the North Pole from Svalbard
 1894–1897: Jackson–Harmsworth expedition, led by Frederick George Jackson, explores Franz Josef Land hoping in vain to find more land polewards
 1895-1896: Ingolf expedition, hydrographical and biological studies in the waters around Greenland, Iceland and Jan Mayen
 1897: Salomon August Andrée leads a failed three man Arctic balloon expedition in an attempt to reach the Pole, Andrée along with Knut Frænkel and Nils Strindberg die
 1898–1899: Failed attempt by Walter Wellman to reach the North Pole from Franz Josef Land
 1898–1902: Second Fram voyage by Otto Sverdrup explores the North American Arctic around Ellesmere Island
 1898-1902: Peary's Sixth Expedition and first attempt at the North Pole
 1898–1900: The Carlsbergfund expedition to East Greenland led by Georg Carl Amdrup explores the Blosseville Coast
 1899: Alfred Gabriel Nathorst explores the fjords of northeast Greenland, in particular the King Oscar Fjord system
 1898–1902: The Swedish–Russian Arc-of-Meridian Expedition measures a meridian arc in Svalbard throughout five summer seasons and one winter season
 1899–1900: Italian North Pole expedition led by Prince Luigi Amedeo, Duke of the Abruzzi on the renamed  captained by Umberto Cagni

20th century

Amundsen and the Heroic Age (1900–1925) 
 1898, 1899, 1906, 1907: Albert I, Prince of Monaco leads four Arctic expeditions with Princesse Alice
 1900–1903: Russian polar expedition of 1900–1902 on-board  is led by Eduard Toll
 1901–1902: Baldwin-Ziegler Polar Expedition financed by US industrialist William Ziegler, led by Evelyn Baldwin
 1902–1904: The Literary expedition led by Ludvig Mylius-Erichsen together with Knud Rasmussen explores the northwest Greenland coast between Uummannaq and Thule
 1903–1906: Roald Amundsen's Gjøa expedition – first Northwest Passage traversal
 1903–1905: Ziegler Polar Expedition overland, led by Anthony Fiala
 1905–1906: North Pole expedition led by Robert Peary, from Ellesmere Island
 1906–1908: The Danmark Expedition led by Ludvig Mylius-Erichsen, mapped the last unknown areas of Northeast Greenland, but ended fatally for the main exploring team
 1906, 1907, 1909: The airship  and Walter Wellman
 1906–1908: Anglo-American Polar expedition (Ejnar Mikkelsen–Ernest de Koven Leffingwell expedition)
 1907: Johan Peter Koch and Aage Bertelsen report seeing Fata Morgana Land, a phantom island off the coast of northeast Greenland

Disputed Polar Claims 
 1907–1909: US North Pole expedition led by Frederick Cook claims to be the first to reach the pole
 1908: expedition led by Charles Bénard explores Novaya Zemlya
 1908–1909: expedition led by Robert Peary also claims reaching the North Pole first
 1909–1912: The Alabama expedition to northeast Greenland led by Ejnar Mikkelsen in an operation to recover bodies and logs of the ill-fated Danmark expedition
 1912: First Thule expedition – Knud Rasmussen and Peter Freuchen explores North Greenland and establishes that Peary Land is not an island
 1912: Swiss expedition led by Alfred de Quervain crosses Greenland by dog-sled
 1912–1913: Johan Peter Koch and Alfred Wegener cross the inland ice in north Greenland
 1912–1914: Brusilov Expedition, ill-fated expedition led by Captain Georgy Brusilov
 1912–1914: Russian expedition aboard Foka, led by Georgy Sedov
 1913: Crocker Land Expedition to search for Crocker Island, a hoax reported by Robert Peary
 1916–1918: Second Thule expedition – Knud Rasmussen and Lauge Koch explore North Greenland
 1918–1925: Roald Amundsen traverses the Northeast Passage with 
 1919: Third Thule expedition – Knud Rasmussen explores north Greenland and lays out depots for Roald Amundsen's polar drift in Maud
 1919–1920: Fourth Thule expedition – Knud Rasmussen explores east Greenland
 1921–1923: Bicentenary Jubilee expedition led by Lauge Koch explores north Greenland
 1921–1923: Wrangel Island Expedition – a land claim and colonisation attempt conceived, but not led by Vilhjalmur Stefansson – all members die apart from Iñupiat seamstress and cook Ada Blackjack
 1921–1924: Fifth Thule expedition led by Knud Rasmussen crossing the Northwest Passage on dog sledges from Thule across Arctic Canada to Nome, Alaska demonstrates how Inuit culture could spread rapidly
 1924: Oxford University Arctic Expedition led by George Binney, uses a seaplane to assist in the first traverse of Nordaustlandet

Byrd and the Aircraft Age (1925–1958) 
 1925: Flying boat expedition led by Roald Amundsen and Lincoln Ellsworth
 1926: Aircraft flight by Richard E. Byrd and Floyd Bennett

Polar Conquest 
 1926: The airship  (Roald Amundsen, Umberto Nobile and Lincoln Ellsworth) becomes the first verified trip to the North Pole
 1928: Carl Ben Eielson–Hubert Wilkins Arctic Ocean crossing
 1928: The airship  (Umberto Nobile); airship crashed, but Nobile was rescued
 1928: Roald Amundsen disappears in the Arctic aboard a Latham 47 while searching for Nobile
 1928: Marion expedition to Davis Strait and Baffin Bay
 1930–1931: Alfred Wegener's German Expedition to Greenland that led to his death on the Greenland ice sheet, halfway between Eismitte and West Camp
 1930: Bratvaag Expedition, led by Gunnar Horn to Franz Josef Land, found long lost remains of Salomon August Andrée's expedition
 1930–1931: British Arctic Air Route Expedition was an expedition, led by Gino Watkins, that aimed to draw improved maps and charts of poorly surveyed sections of Greenland's coastline
 1931: Successful research trip by airship Graf Zeppelin led by Hugo Eckener
 1931: Sixth Thule expedition led by Knud Rasmussen explores northeast Greenland
 1931: Arne Høygaard and Martin Mehren cross Greenland by dog-sled
 1931–1934: The three-year expedition to East Greenland led by Lauge Koch explores northeast Greenland

Second International Polar Year 
 1932: Icebreaker  makes the successful crossing of the Northern Sea Route in a single navigation without wintering
 1932–1933: East Greenland expedition, also known as the Pan Am expedition, a four-man expedition to continue the work of the British Arctic Air Route Expedition
 1932–1933: Dalstroy expedition to the Kolyma River in a convoy headed by the icebreaker 
 1933: Russian steamship  managed to get through most of the Northern Route before it was caught in the ice in September
 1934: British Trans-Greenland Expedition led by Martin Lindsay
 1935: Ushakov Island, the last piece of undiscovered territory in the Soviet Arctic, was found by Georgy Ushakov aboard the 
 1935: French expedition led by Paul-Émile Victor crosses Greenland by dog-sled
 1937: Soviet aircraft Tupolev ANT-25 made several transpolar flights
 1937: Soviet and Russian manned drifting ice stations are, as of 2017, 41 scientific drift stations operating or were operating on drift ice
 1937–1938: MacGregor Arctic Expedition was led by Clifford J. MacGregor and overwintered at Etah, Greenland
 1938–1939: Mørkefjord expedition was an exploratory expedition to northeast Greenland led by Eigil Knuth

Post-War 
 1946: Operation Nanook was a US cartographic mission to Thule and to erect a radio and weather station
 1948: Russian scientific expedition led by Aleksandr Kuznetsov lands an aircraft at Pole 
 1952–1954: British North Greenland expedition was a British scientific mission, led by Commander James Simpson
 1955: Cross-polar flight by Louise Arner Boyd

Era of Satellites, Submarines and Icebreakers (1958–onward) 
 1958: USS Nautilus (SSN-571) crosses the Arctic Ocean from the Pacific to the Atlantic beneath the polar sea ice, reaching the North Pole on 3 August 1958
 1959: Discoverer 1, a prototype with no camera, is the first satellite in polar orbit
 1959: USS Skate (SSN-578) becomes first submarine to surface at the North Pole on 17 March 1959
 1960: TIROS-1, is the first weather satellite in polar orbit; eventually returned 22,952 cloud cover photos
 1968: Ralph Plaisted and three others reach the North Pole by snowmobile and are the first confirmed overland conquest of the Pole
 1968–1969: Wally Herbert, British explorer, reaches Pole on foot and traverses the Arctic Ocean
 1971: Former football player Tony Dauksza becomes the first person to traverse the Northwest Passage in a canoe
 1977: , nuclear-powered icebreaker, reaches the North Pole
 1979–1982: Kenichi Horie in Mermaid, was the first person to sail the Northwest Passage solo
 1982: As part of the Transglobe Expedition Sir Ranulph Fiennes and Charles R. Burton cross the Arctic Ocean in a single season
 1986: Will Steger and party reach the north pole by dog sled without resupply
 1986–1989: David Scott Cowper became the first person to have completed the Northwest Passage single-handed as part of a circumnavigation of the world
 1988: Will Steger completes first south–north traverse of Greenland
 1988: Soviet–Canadian 1988 Polar Bridge Expedition a group of thirteen Russian and Canadian skiers set out from Siberia skiing to Canada over the North Pole aided by satellites.
 1991-1992: Lonnie Dupre completes first west to east winter crossing of arctic Canada traveling by dog team from Prudhoe Bay, Alaska via the northwest passage before turning south ending in Churchill, Manitoba.  The 3000-mile journey started in October and ended in April. 
 1992: Crossing of the Greenland inland ice from east to west by a Japanese expedition led by Kenji Yoshikawa
 1993–1994: Pam Flowers dog sledded alone from Barrow, Alaska, to Repulse Bay (Naujaat), Canada
 1994: Shane Lundgren led expedition that began in Moscow and proceeded north of the Arctic Circle across Siberia to Magadan
 1995: Marek Kamiński unsupported walked to the North Pole on 23 May 1995 (27 December 1995, he reached the South Pole alone)

21st century 

 2000: Ukrainian parachute expedition to the North Pole
 2001: Lonnie Dupre with teammate John Holescher complete the first circumnavigation of Greenland, a 6,500 mile, all non-motorized journey by kayak and dog team.
 2002: Jean Lemire and the crew of the  successfully navigate the Northwest Passage on a three-mast schooner, sailing from Montreal to Vancouver in five months while filming La grande traversée and four other documentaries about the effects of global warming on the Canadian Arctic Archipelago (at the time, only the seventh sailboat in history to make the legendary Northwest Passage from east to west) 
 2003: Pen Hadow makes solo trek from Canada to North Pole without resupply
 2004: Five members of the Ice Warrior Squad reach the Geomagnetic North Pole, including the first two women in history to do so.
 2006: Start of the French Tara expedition
 2007: Arktika 2007, Russian submersible descends to the ocean floor below the North Pole from the 
 2007: Top Gear: Polar Special, BBC's Top Gear team are the first to reach the magnetic North Pole in a car
 2007: The Arctic Mars Analog Svalbard Expedition uses Mars analog sites on Svalbard for testing of science questions and payload instruments onboard Mars missions
 2008: Alex Hibbert and George Bullard complete the Tiso Trans Greenland expedition. The longest fully unsupported land Arctic journey in history at 
 2009: David Scott Cowper becomes the only person to have sailed the Northwest Passage solo in a single season.
 2011: MLAE-2011 led by Vasily Igorevich Yelagin travelled from Dudinka, Russia – North Pole – Resolute, Nunavut, Canada
 2011: Old Pulteney Row To The Pole, a publicity stunt sponsored by Old Pulteney whisky, organised by Jock Wishart who also operated the  Polar Race
 2015: Interdisciplinary Arctic Expedition "Kartesh" – complex arctic expedition, organized by the Polar Expedition Gallery project (later rebranded as Polar Expedition "Kartesh") in collaboration with the LMSU Marine Research Center. Research tasks: assessing the Arctic coastline vulnerability towards human impact; marine and coastal ecosystem and Arctic seas landform condition monitoring; West Arctic biodiversity research; oil oxidizing microorganism activity research; testing new methods of water areas remote sensing.
 2017: Polar Row, led by Fiann Paul, is the world's most record-breaking expedition (14 Guinness World Records). The team covered 1440 miles measured in a straight line in the Arctic Ocean open waters in a row boat and pioneered ocean rowing routes from Tromsø to Longyearbyen, from Longyearbyen to Arctic Ice Pack (79º55'500 N) and from the Arctic ice pack to Jan Mayen.
 2019: MOSAiC Expedition under the direction of the Alfred Wegener Institute for Polar and Marine Research with 300 scientists from 20 nations on board the German ice-breaker Polarstern to collect data about the ocean, the ice, the atmosphere and life in the Arctic in order to understand climate change

See also 
 List of Antarctic expeditions
 List of firsts at the Geographic North Pole

Footnotes 

Expeditions
 
 
Lists of expeditions